The Iavardi is a river in Romania, right tributary of the Valea Rece. It flows into the Valea Rece in the village Valea Rece. A major feature of the river is the 7-metre-high Zógó waterfall.

The river's valley is notable for its lower Triassic limestone formations, and is regarded as one of the most beautiful valleys in the region.

References

Rivers of Romania
Rivers of Harghita County